Melody Event Center, formerly Melody Ballroom, is an historic building in southeast Portland, Oregon's Buckman neighborhood, in the United States. Built in 1925, the structure previously housed the headquarters for the life insurance company Woodmen of the World.

References

External links

 

1925 establishments in Oregon
Buckman, Portland, Oregon
Buildings and structures completed in 1925
Buildings and structures in Portland, Oregon
Event venues in Oregon